John Michael Mackenzie Hooper (23 April 1947 – 2 April 2010) was an English cricketer who played first-class and List A cricket for Surrey from 1967 to 1972.

Mike Hooper was a champion schoolboy cricketer at Charterhouse, and played for English combined schools sides in 1964 and 1965. He was the leading scorer when an MCC Schools team toured South Africa in 1965–66.

He began playing for Surrey in 1967. When Surrey won the Second Eleven Championship in 1968 he scored 805 runs at an average of 53.66, including 168 in an innings victory over Kent. In 10 matches in the County Championship that year, however, he scored only 164 runs at an average of 11.71.
 
He played irregularly for Surrey thereafter without scoring a fifty. After the 1971 season he left cricket to work in the City of London. He continued to play club cricket, and helped Charterhouse Friars win the Cricketer Cup on three occasions. He toured Bangladesh with MCC in 1976-77. His son, Harry, also played first-class cricket.

References

External links

1947 births
2010 deaths
People educated at Charterhouse School
English cricketers
Surrey cricketers